In 1819 the British government of India decided to mount an expedition to Ras Al Khaimah to suppress piracy in the Persian Gulf.

A British memo of 1819 stated:

For the expedition the government engaged a number of merchant vessels to transport troops and ordnance stores.

†:Register;
‡: Phipps; no mark when both agree

Following the surrender of Ras Al Khaimah and Dhayah Fort, the British expeditionary force then blew up the buildings comprising the town of Ras Al Khaimah and established a garrison there of 800 sepoys and artillery, before visiting Jazirat Al Hamra, which was found to be deserted. They went on to destroy the fortifications and larger vessels of Umm Al Qawain, Ajman, Fasht, Sharjah, Abu Hail, and Dubai. Ten vessels that had taken shelter in Bahrain were also destroyed. The Royal Navy suffered no casualties during the action.

Citations and references
Citations

References
 East-India register and directory (1819)
 
 
 
 

Lists of sailing ships
Lists of ships of the United Kingdom
Anti-piracy